Ó Snodaigh is a surname. Notable people with the surname include:

 Aengus Ó Snodaigh, Irish politician
 Colm Ó Snodaigh, Irish musician
 Pádraig Ó Snodaigh, Irish language activist, poet, writer, and publisher
 Rónán Ó Snodaigh, Irish musician, poet, and vocalist
 Rossa Ó Snodaigh, member of Kíla